Annoix is a commune in the Cher department in the Centre-Val de Loire region of France.

Geography

Population

Sights
The church of St.Pierre, dating from the twelfth century and restored between 1837 and 1840.
The remains of a Roman aqueduct.
An old watermill.
The Château Gaillard.

See also
Communes of the Cher department

References

Communes of Cher (department)